Vanessa Media Inc. is a multiplatform TV Canadian company that specializes in the distribution of adult linear HD signals, multiplex and On Demand, as well as in monthly VOD, SVOD, PPV and licensing offers on TV provider's transactional platforms across North America and on the international market.

In 2010, Vanessa Media established Vivid TV Canada channel (formerly Vanessa TV).

In March 2017, Vanessa Media launched its second channel Hustler TV Canada.

In October 2017, Vanessa Media began a partnership with Marc Dorcel to start a third adult channel in Canada, Dorcel TV, with a monthly offer of VSD 4K HD.

References

External links
 Official Website

Companies based in Montreal
Television broadcasting companies of Canada